As Sunnatayn, also transliterated as al-Sinnatayn, is a village in Khamir District of 'Amran Governorate, Yemen. It is located a bit to the south of Khamir.

History 
Robert T.O. Wilson identified As Sunnatayn with the al-Sinnatān mentioned in the 10th century writer al-Hamdani in his geographic work Sifat Jazirat al-Arab. According to him, it is also referred to by Muhammad ibn Salah al-Sharafi as being adjacent to the territory of Bilad al-Kalbiyyin, although the reading is uncertain.

References 

Populated places in 'Amran Governorate